Salokbat is a tambon (sub-district) of Amphoe Khanu Woralaksaburi, Kamphaeng Phet Province, upper central Thailand. In 2018 it had a total population of 11,789 people.

It is important as a rest area for buses that travel between Bangkok and many provinces in the north. There are restrooms and souvenir shops with restaurants serving buffet for passengers of some bus companies.

Administration

Central administration
The tambon is subdivided into 7 administrative villages (muban).

Local administration
The area of the subdistrict is shared by 2 local governments.
the subdistrict municipality (Thesaban Tambon) Salokbat (เทศบาลตำบลสลกบาตร)
the subdistrict administrative organization (SAO) Salokbat (องค์การบริหารส่วนตำบลสลกบาตร)

References

External links
 Thaitambon.com on Salokbat
 Website of Salokbat subdistrict administrative organization

Tambon of Kamphaeng Phet Province